Biberach may refer to:

Biberach an der Riß, a town in Upper Swabia, Germany
Biberach (district), which has Biberach an der Riß as its capital
Biberach, Baden, a municipality in the Ortenaukreis, Germany
Biberach is a part of Roggenburg, Bavaria, Germany
Biberach is also a part of the town of Heilbronn, Germany

See also
Battle of Biberach (1800), a May 9, 1800 battle at Biberach an der Riß